In Session is a compilation album of two BBC Radio 1 sessions by the English band New Order, released in 2004. The first five tracks were recorded in 1998 for the John Peel radio show. These songs mark the group's third John Peel session. Tracks 6 to 9 were recorded for the BBC Radio 1 Evening Session in 2001. "Transmission" is a video recorded in 2002 for John Peel's 40th anniversary party.

The session tracks were produced by Miti Adhikari. The artwork was designed by the group's longtime collaborator Peter Saville with photography by Jon Wozencroft.

Track listing

Personnel
New Order
Phil Cunningham - guitar and keyboards (6–9)
Gillian Gilbert - keyboards (1–5)
Peter Hook - bass
Stephen Morris - drums
Bernard Sumner - vocals, guitarAdditional personnel
Dawn Zee - backing vocals (8)
Bobby Gillespie - backing vocals (9)
Miti Adhikari - producer
George Thomas - engineer (1–5)
Guy Worth - engineer (6–9)
Miles Prowse - filming (10)
Peter Saville Studio - design
Jon Wozencroft - photography

References

New Order (band) compilation albums
2004 compilation albums
New Order (band) live albums
2004 live albums